This is a list of currently flags flown by military powers worldwide. All flags in this list are for specific use for a branch of or the whole national military of a given state.


Albania

Algeria

Antigua and Barbuda

Argentina

Australia

Bangladesh

Belarus

Belgium

Brazil

Canada 

Former flags

Colombia

People’s Republic of China

Egypt

Finland

France

Estonia

Georgia

Former flags

Germany 

Former flags

India

Iran

Iraq

Former flags

Ireland

Israel

Italy

Japan

Jordan

Kenya

Korea (North) 

Former flags

Korea (South)

Lithuania

Malaysia

Mexico

Mongolia

Morocco

Myanmar (Burma)

Namibia

Netherlands

New Zealand

Nigeria

Pakistan

Peru

Philippines

Poland

Russia 

Former flags

Saudi Arabia

Serbia 

 
Former flags

Slovenia

Somalia

South Africa

Former flags

Sri Lanka

Sweden

Republic of China (Exiled in Taiwan)

Thailand

Turkmenistan

Türkiye

United Arab Emirates

Ukraine

United Kingdom

United States 

Former flags

Uruguay

Venezuela

Vietnam

Former flags

References

Military flags
 Military